Catherine Daugé (born 13 October 1956) is a French gymnast. She competed at the 1972 Summer Olympics.

References

External links
 

1956 births
Living people
French female artistic gymnasts
Olympic gymnasts of France
Gymnasts at the 1972 Summer Olympics
Place of birth missing (living people)
20th-century French women